Mary Collinson (22 July 1952 – 23 November 2021) was a Maltese-British model and actress. She was chosen as Playboy magazine's Playmate of the Month in October 1970, together with her twin sister Madeleine Collinson. They were the first identical twin Playmate sisters.

The Collinson twins first arrived in Britain in April 1969, and prior to their appearance in Playboy one of the first people to use them was the glamour photographer/film maker Harrison Marks who cast them as saucy maids in his short film Halfway Inn. The film, made for the 8mm market, was shot sometime between their British arrival, and July 1970, when a still from the film was used in a Marks advertisement that ran in that month's issue of Continental Film Review magazine.

Her sister was quoted in The Playmate Book saying that Mary had two daughters and lived in Milan with an "Italian gentleman", whom she had been with for more than 20 years.

Collinson died from bronchopneumonia in Milan, on 23 November 2021, at the age of 69.

Filmography 
Come Back Peter (1969)
 Permissive (1970)
Groupie Girl (1970)
 She'll Follow You Anywhere (1971)
The Love Machine (1971)Twins of Evil (a.k.a. Twins of Dracula) (1971)

 Notable TV guest appearances The Tonight Show Starring Johnny Carson, 16 September 1970

Magazine appearances
 Impact '70 magazine 1970 Vol. 1. No 1 "Double Exposure" photo story made up of stills from 'Halfway Inn'.
 Mascotte magazine August 1970 "Mary Collins" nude photos and Miss Mascotte centerfold
 Cinema X magazine 1972 Vol.4 No.3 "Those Curvy Collinsons meet The Love Machine"
 Titbits'' magazine 11 July 1973 "Which Twin has the Twinge"

See also
List of people in Playboy 1970–1979

References

External links 
 
 

1952 births
2021 deaths
1970s Playboy Playmates
British film actresses
British identical twins
British television actresses
Identical twin actresses
Maltese actresses
People from Sliema
Twin models
Maltese twins